Tazeh Kand (also Romanized as Tāzeh Kand and Tāzekand) is a village in Shoja Rural District, in the Central District of Jolfa County, East Azerbaijan Province, Iran. At the 2006 census, its population was 45, in 13 families.

References 

Populated places in Jolfa County